is the sequel to the original Super Formation Soccer video game (known as Super Soccer in Europe and North America), which was released exclusively in Japan in 1993. The most significant innovation over its prequel was the introduction of a four-player mode, and a battery backup to replace the passwords.

Reception
In Japan, the game topped the Famitsu sales charts in June 1993 and July 1993.

See also
 SNES Multitap
 Super Formation Soccer 94
 Super Formation Soccer 95: della Serie A
 Super Formation Soccer 96: World Club Edition

References

External links
 Super Formation Soccer II (overview) at broseb.com 
 Super Soccer 2 Latinoamérica La Mejor Página de Soccer 2: Partidos, Trucos, Revistas, Reviews, Soundtrack, Habilidades, Figuras Panini, Películas. Los esperamos!
Super Soccer 2 - Sistema Elo Comunidad y Ranking Oficial ELO de los mejores jugadores de la actualidad.

1993 video games
Association football video games
Human Entertainment games
Japan-exclusive video games
Super Nintendo Entertainment System games
Super Nintendo Entertainment System-only games
Video game sequels
Multiplayer and single-player video games
Video games developed in Japan